Miguel Báez Espuny (5 October 1930 – 18 May 2022) was a Spanish bullfighter known as El Litri.

Biography
Born in Gandía, Spain, Báez was descended from one of the most important bullfighting dynasties in Huelva. In 1960 he narrated and starred in the film Litri and His Shadow (Spanish: El Litri y su sombra). His father Miguel Báez and stepbrother Manuel Báez were also bullfighters known as "El Litri", as is his son Miguel Báez Espínola.

He served on the Spanish jury of the Eurovision Song Contest 1988 and was awarded the Medal of Andalusia in 2007.

References

External links 
 Miguel Báez Espuny at Terra.es 

1930 births
2022 deaths
People from Gandia
Sportspeople from the Province of Valencia
Spanish bullfighters